Twenty First Century Skinned is the first remix album by Praga Khan. It was released in 1999.

Track listing
 "Breakfast in Vegas (Insider Remix)" – 4:32	
 "Isolation (Screaming to Be with You Remix)" – :40	
 "Visions & Imaginations (Box Energy Mix)" – 3:49	
 "Far Beyond the Sun (Adrift on Oscillators Mix)" – 4:41	
 "What's Wrong with Me (That Shits Wild Mix)" – 4:02	
 "Lonely (Court-Circuit Remix)" – 5:00	
 "Supersonic Lovetoy (Sonic Dub)" – 4:43	
 "Lady Alcohol (Where the Fuck am I Mix)" – 4:33	
 "Bored Out of My Mind (Laurent Barbier Mix)" – 3:39	
 "Begin to Move (Dark Zone Mix)" – 4:59	
 "One Foot in the Grave (Artificial Life Mix)" – 5:32	
 "Adult Entertainment (Here Comes the Whip Mix)" – 3:21

References

1999 remix albums